PS-30 Khairpur-V is a constituency of the Provincial Assembly of Sindh.

General elections 2018

See also
 PS-29 Khairpur-IV
 PS-31 Khairpur-VI

References

External links
 Election commission Pakistan's official website
 Awazoday.com check result
 Official Website of Government of Sindh

Constituencies of Sindh